Sam Lundholm (born 1 July 1994), is a Swedish football player who plays as a winger.

References

External links
Sam Lundholm at AIK's official website 
 

1994 births
Living people
Footballers from Stockholm
Swedish footballers
Sweden youth international footballers
Sweden under-21 international footballers
Swedish expatriate footballers
AIK Fotboll players
IK Sirius Fotboll players
NEC Nijmegen players
Randers FC players
Allsvenskan players
Eredivisie players
Danish Superliga players
Expatriate footballers in the Netherlands
Expatriate men's footballers in Denmark
Association football wingers